Jyllian Gunther is a writer, producer, and director.

Productions 
Jyllian Gunther is an Emmy-award-winning director, producer and writer. 

She specializes in verité documentary and has a keen interest in exploring the stories of young people and old people. 

Her third documentary, Sunset & The Mockingbird, is currently in post production and presented at IDFA Forum 2019. 

Most recently, she was show runner/director for the  History/A&E documentary, Black Patriots featuring Kareem Abdul-Jabbar, February 2020. 

Since 2016, she has been supervising producer/director on multiple episodes of the NBC Emmy award-winning series, Who Do You Think You Are, featuring Allison Janney, Nick Offerman, and numerous others.

She was producer for ABC's The Last Defense, a seven part docu-series executive produced by Viola Davis. 

She was director/producer/writer for six short films for the JigSaw, Amazon, and The New Yorker magazine series, The New Yorker Presents. 

Her second award-winning feature documentary, The New Public, aired on PBS, is widely available online, and is distributed by Kino Lorber with a curriculum created by Teachers College at Columbia University, It has been added to the collections of libraries at hundreds of educational institutions nationwide.

Her first critically acclaimed documentary, Pull Out, was an official selection of numerous national and international film festivals. It is also available online.  

She served as reporter/co-producer for NPR's acclaimed, This American Life program. (Episodes:“Kid Politics” & “Stuck In the Middle.”) 

She began her television career as a staff writer for Nickelodeon. She was a freelance writer/producer of countless promos and producer/director on various docu-series for Discovery Channel, TLC, MTV, AMC, IFC, and WEtv, and other networks.

She created two original series that are currently in development with partners including The Documentary Group and Peacock Productions.

She has worked as a public and private school educator in film, art and creative writing from elementary to college level students. 

She runs the production company Wonderful6, Inc.

Partial filmography 
 Sunset and the Mockingbird * feature film (director/producer/writer)
 The New Public * feature film (director/producer/camera)
 Pull Out feature film (Director/Producer/Writer) 
 The New Yorker Presents Series. (director/writer/producer)
 This American Life(reporter) (2011) 
 Who Do You Think You Are Series. (director/supervising producer)
 Postcards From Buster Series. (director) PBS
 Made (director/producer) Series. MTV)
 Love High (director/producer) Series pilot. (NOGGIN)
 THINKPORT.ORG(co-director/writer) Emmy Award-winning PSA series for PBS.

References

External links 

 
 The New Public Movie (Director)
 Wonderful6

Living people
Year of birth missing (living people)
American documentary film directors
American television directors
Place of birth missing (living people)